Bonnefamille is a commune in the Isère department in southeastern France.

Name
Before the French Revolution, the parish was called Menue-Famille. The name was changed by Charles X on 8 Jun 1825 to Bonne-Famille.

Population

Twin towns
Bonnefamille is twinned with:

  Glonn, Germany

See also
Communes of the Isère department

References

Communes of Isère
Isère communes articles needing translation from French Wikipedia